Solidago elongata, commonly called West Coast Canada goldenrod or  Cascade Canada goldenrod, is a North American species of flowering plants in the family Asteraceae. It is native to western Canada, western United States, and northwestern Mexico, primarily in British Columbia, Washington, Oregon, California, and Baja California, with a few populations in Nevada and Idaho. It grows in the Coast Ranges, the Sierra Nevada, the Cascades, and other mountain ranges in the region.

Solidago elongata is a perennial herb up to 150 cm (5 feet) tall, spreading by means of underground rhizomes. One plant can produce 500 or more small yellow flower heads in a large branching (sometimes drooping) array at the top of the plant.

References

elongata
Flora of North America
Plants described in 1840